Shu Xingbei (October 1, 1905 - October 30, 1983), also known as Hsin Pei Soh, was a Chinese physicist and educator.

Life

Early years
Shu was born on 1 October 1905, in Hanjiang, Jiangsu Province. In 1924, he entered Hangchow University (aka Zhijiang University 之江大学, now named Zhejiang University) in Hangzhou, Zhejiang Province and a year later transferred to the Department of Physics at Cheeloo University in Shandong Province.

Travel/study in USA & Europe
In 1926, Shu went to study physics in the United States, where he initially studied at Baker University in Baldwin City, Kansas, but later transferred to the University of California, San Francisco (UCSF). During this time, Shu was quite active in various social and political activities and communities, and it is said that he even once joined the Communist Party USA.

In July 1927, Shu left the US and travelled through Japan, Korea, Manchuria, Moscow, and Warsaw, eventually reaching Germany where he principally visited Berlin, Hannover and Hamburg. Shu then went to the UK, where, in October 1928 he enrolled in the University of Edinburgh to study mathematics and physics under E. T. Whittaker and Charles Galton Darwin, obtaining his MSc after one year. Finally, in February 1930 Shu went to the University of Cambridge, and worked under Arthur Stanley Eddington, who that August advised him to return to the US to the Massachusetts Institute of Technology (MIT).

Shu took this advice, becoming a teaching assistant at the MIT Department of Mathematics and obtaining a second MSc under Dirk Jan Struik.

At Zhejiang University
In September 1931, Shu returned to China, largely due to pressure from his mother to marry his fiancée, Ge Chuhua. Shu's first position was in physics at the Whampoa Military Academy but in September 1932, invited by the chair (Zhang Shaozhong ) of the Department of Physics of Zhejiang University, he began teaching there. In August 1935, Shu became chairperson of the Department of Mathematics of Jinan University, which was at that time located in Shanghai. Shu was also an adjunct lecturer at Jiaotong University. In April 1936, President Coching Chu of Zhejiang University invited him to return to that institution, where, in August 1936, Shu was promoted to the rank of associate professor, then in 1937, professor. At Zhejiang University, he collaborated closely with Kan-Chang Wang. During this period, some famous students of his include: Cheng Kaijia, Xu Liangying, Hu Jimin, and Zhou Zhicheng. Most notably, one of his students, Tsung-Dao Lee went on to win the 1957 Nobel Prize for Physics for his work on the violation of parity conservation in weak interactions; Lee (together with Chen-Ning Yang) was awarded the price for the theory. Another student of his was Chien-Shiung Wu, who received recognition for the experimental verification of the parity violation. She received in 1978 the Wolf Prize in physics.

From 1949 to 1979
In 1952, Shu was transferred to the Department of Physics at Shandong University in Jinan, Shandong Province, then in 1954 to its Department of Oceanography.

In 1956, classified as a leader of anti-revolutionary forces, Shu was purged. In June 1958, during the Anti-Rightist Movement, Shu was denounced as an ultra-rightist and an anti-revolutionary. Under the program of "reform through labor" (laogai), he was sent to work on the construction of the Yuezikou Reservoir in Qingdao. In 1960, Shu was transferred to the Qingdao Medical College as a teacher, although he was also obliged to clean toilets in the college and to wash lab equipment.

On 11 September 1974, Shu partially regained his normal life. In 1978, Shu was transferred to the Chinese State Oceanic Administration where he became a professor and senior researcher for oceanic dynamics at its First Research Institute of Oceanography. In the 1970s, Shu did successful calculations for the Pacific Ocean test of the Dongfeng V intercontinental ballistic missile. In 1979, when the Oceanic Physics Branch of the Chinese Society of Oceanography was established in Guangzhou, Shu was elected its honorary director-general.

In December 1979, the Chinese government completely removed Shu's classification as a rightist and anti-revolutionary, restoring his reputation.

From 1979 to his death
In August 1981, Shu was elected honorary director-general of the Shandong Society of Physics and, in that same year, he was named honorary director of the Qingdao Society of Physics. Shu Xingbei died on 30 October 1985, at the age of 77.

Personal life
Shu Xingbei married Ge Chuhua in 1931. The couple had seven children: Shu Yuexin, Shu Huxin, Shu Xiaoxin, Shu Qingxin, Shu Yixin, Shu Runxin and Shu Meixin.

Selected publications
 Soh, Hsin P., A new law of planetary distances and orbital velocities, Popular Astronomy, Vol. 35, p. 327
 .
 .
 Hsin P. Soh; Theory of gravitation and electromagnetism, 1934, 国立浙江大学科学报告 (Science reports, University of Chekiang), 1(1):135-142
 Hsin Pei Soh; Relativity transformations connecting two systems in arbitrary acceleration. Nature, 1946, 58:99-100
 Hsin Pei Soh,  Mu-Hsien Wang &  Su-Chin Kiang; Relative Nature of Electromagnetic Radiation; Nature 157, 809-809 (15 June 1946) | .

Books
  Selected Academic Works of Shu Xingbei; Ocean Press; ; 2007.
 Special Relativity (textbook); Qingdao Press; ; 1995.

References

Memorial essays
 许良英，《我所了解的束星北先生》，《科学时报》，2005年12月23日 (Xu Liangying: Mr. Shu Xingbei as I Know; Chinese Science Bulletin; 23rd Dec, 2005)
 李政道，《怀念束星北先生》，《中国海洋报》，2007年9月25日. (Tsung-Dao Lee: The Memorial of Shu Xingbei; China Ocean News; 25th Sep, 2007)
 李政道，《启蒙恩师束星北》，《中国海洋报》，2007年10月12日. (Tsung-Dao Lee: (My) Enlightenment Mentor Shu Xingbei; China Ocean News; 12th Oct, 2007)
 王淦昌，《束星北的一生是伟大的》，《中国海洋报》，2007年9月25日. (Wang Ganchang: The Great Life of Shu Xingbei; China Ocean News; 25th Sep, 2007)
 程开甲，《真理面前百折不曲》，《中国海洋报》，2007年9月25日. (Cheng Kaijia: Never Bend-over Facing Truth; China Ocean News; 25th Sep, 2007)

External links
 100 Anniversary Commemoration Celebration of Shu Xingbei Held Yesterday (in English, 2007-09-29)
 Shu Xingbei's Former Residence (in English, Sina.com)

Alumni of the University of Edinburgh
Educators from Yangzhou
Physicists from Jiangsu
Massachusetts Institute of Technology School of Science alumni
Zhejiang University alumni
Academic staff of Zhejiang University
1905 births
1983 deaths
Academic staff of the Republic of China Military Academy
Academic staff of Shanghai Jiao Tong University
Academic staff of Shandong University
Victims of the Cultural Revolution
Scientists from Yangzhou
Victims of the Anti-Rightist Campaign
Republic of China science writers
Writers from Yangzhou